The Principal is a 1987 crime thriller action film starring Jim Belushi, Louis Gossett Jr. and Rae Dawn Chong. Written by Frank Deese and directed by Christopher Cain, it was filmed in Oakland, California, and at Northgate High School in nearby Walnut Creek and distributed by TriStar Pictures on Panavision. Belushi reprised his role as Rick Latimer in the 1991 film Abraxas, Guardian of the Universe.

Plot

After spotting his ex-wife Kimberly in a bar one night with her attorney, alcoholic high-school teacher Rick Latimer instigates a fight with him, culminating in Rick bashing the hapless man's car with a baseball bat. Rick is arrested for the incident.

Finding that Rick's behavior is tarnishing the school district's image, the board of education decides to transfer him elsewhere and send him to Brandel High, a crime-ridden and gang-dominated institution where unruly kids are sent after being expelled from other schools. Initially, Rick is just as lost, incorrigible, & hopeless as the students of “Brand X” (the nickname that everyone derisively calls the school).

Believing he can repair his image by cleaning up the school, Rick has an assembly and declares his intentions: "No more." No more drugs, no more running in the hallways, and no more being late to class. During his speech, Victor Duncan, the leader of the school's dominant gang, appears, derides Rick in front of everyone, and walks out. This sparks a small riot, which earns Rick the enmity of the teachers and Jake, the school head of security and a graduate of Brandel.

Eventually, Rick manages to enforce his policies, getting rid of the drugs being dealt in the bathrooms, and clearing out the hallways — but not always successfully. As the students are now forced to go to class, some of the more unruly ones become increasingly disruptive, including troublemaker White Zac, who eventually attempts to rape one of the teachers, Ms. Orozco. She throws a chair through one of her classroom windows which alerts Rick that something is wrong. He then rides his motorcycle into the school and chases down White Zac, beating him unconscious and stuffing him into a trash can.

Victor, meanwhile, continues to assert his influence on the school, going so far as to brutally beat Emile, a former member of his gang. When Emile warms to Rick's teaching style and actually starts learning, Victor hangs him by his ankles in the school. Rick is also ambushed and beaten while Victor's gang defaces his motorcycle. Arturo and his friends in shop class repair the motorcycle and paint "El Principal" on the gas tank and on Rick's helmet. After a confrontation in the lunch room, Victor threatens Rick, warning him that if he shows up the next day, he is going to die. Rick scoffs and walks away as Victor continues to threaten him.

The next day, after classes have been dismissed, Victor and his crew show up and sneak into the school. While Jake goes to chain the doors, Rick discovers that Victor's crew has cut the phone lines when he tries to call 911. A game of cat and mouse ensues. Jake gets locked in a storage closet by one of Victor's crew, while Rick hides in the girls' shower room with a baseball bat, waiting for Victor. After a brief chase, Victor and Jojo ambush him. While holding Rick at gunpoint, Victor orders Jojo to cut him. But Jojo refuses, telling Victor that killing Rick would bring down the crew. Victor shoots Jojo in the head, killing him, but before he can shoot Rick, Arturo intervenes and strikes Victor with Rick's baseball bat. The distraction leads to a showdown in the school halls between Victor and Rick. Initially, Victor seems to have the upper hand, but Rick overpowers him and beats Victor senseless, throwing him through the schoolhouse doors.

Rick's beating of Victor greatly shocks the rest of the school who witness the fight. Several students cheer Rick on, much to the chagrin of Victor's gang members. After a small fight breaks out Rick again declares, "No more!", which stops the fight quickly. The police finally arrive and Victor is arrest for murdering Jojo and taken away. A student derisively asks Rick, "Hey man, who the hell do you think you are?!". Rick responds "I'm the principal, man!" and rides away on his motorcycle.

Cast
 Jim Belushi as Principal Rick Latimer
 Louis Gossett Jr. as Jake Phillips, Head Guard
 Rae Dawn Chong as Hilary Orozco, History Teacher
 Michael Wright as Victor Duncan, Gang Leader and Drug Dealer
 Reggie Johnson as Joe "Jo-Jo"
 Jeffrey Jay Cohen as Zac "White Zac" Mawby
 Kelly Minter as Treena Lester
 Esai Morales as Raymundo "Raymi" Rojas
 Troy Winbush as Emile "Baby Emile"
 Jacob Vargas as Arturo Diego

Box office
The Principal was moderately successful commercially, grossing a total of $19,734,940 domestically.

Reception
On Rotten Tomatoes the film has an approval rating of 50% based on reviews from 10 critics. On Metacritic the film has a score of 37% based on reviews from 8 critics. Audiences surveyed by CinemaScore gave the film a grade B on scale of A to F.

See also 
 List of hood films

References

External links
 
 
 
 
 

1987 films
American comedy-drama films
American action thriller films
1980s crime action films
American crime action films
1980s action thriller films
Films about drugs
Films about educators
Films about rape
Films about school violence
Films set in San Francisco
Films set in the San Francisco Bay Area
Films shot in California
American gang films
1980s high school films
American vigilante films
TriStar Pictures films
Hood films
Films directed by Christopher Cain
1980s English-language films
1980s American films